Bauro, or Tairaha, is a language of the San Cristobal family, and is spoken in the central part of the island of Makira, formerly known as San Cristobal in the Solomon Islands.

References

Languages of the Solomon Islands
Malaita-San Cristobal languages